The Zhuoying Spring (literally "washing out the tassel spring") is a culturally significant artesian karst spring located in historical center of the city of Jinan, Shandong Province, China. It is listed among the 72 famous springs 
() of Jinan (as number 19.). The spring forms a large spring pool, the Palace Pool, that is used as a public outdoor swimming pool. 
 
The name "Zhuoying Spring" comes from a poem from Mencius, "Li Lou Shang", that contains the phrase "wash out the tassel". 
 
When the army of the Jin dynasty invaded Jinan moving southward into the territory of the Southern Song Dynasty, the local garrison commander, Guan Sheng, refused to surrender. A bloody battle ensued and the soldiers washed the textile decorations of their lancets in the Palace Pool. 
 
The name "Palace Pool" dates back to the time of the Ming Dynasty, when the De Wang Palace was constructed at the site and the spring pool was included into its grounds. Today, the pool lies in a historical residential neighborhood with private residences on the water edge.

References

See also
List of sites in Jinan

Buildings and structures in Shandong